Selenophene is an unsaturated organic compound containing a five-member ring with selenium with formula C4H4Se. A colorless liquid, it is one of the more common selenium heterocycles.

Nomenclature
Atoms in selenophene are numbered sequentially around the ring, starting with the selenium atom as number 1 following normal systematic nomenclature rules. Oxidized forms include selenophene 1,1-dioxide. Related ring structures include those with only one double bond (2-selenolene and 3-selenolene) and the fully saturated structure selenolane.

Production
Mazza and Solazzo reported the first confirmed synthesis in 1927. By treating selenium with  acetylene and at about 300 °C yields up to 15% selenophene were obtained.  Benzoselenophene (analogue of benzothiophene) was also produced. 

Substituted selenophenes can be made using a Fiesselman procedure in which a β-chloro-aldehyde reacts with sodium selenide, and then ethyl bromoacetate.

Properties
The selenophene molecule is flat. Being aromatic, it undergoes electrophilic substitution reactions.  As for thiophene, electrophiles tend to attack at the carbon positions next to the chalcogen.  Such reactions are slower than that of furan, but faster than thiophene.

References

Selenium(−II) compounds
Heterocyclic compounds with 1 ring
Selenium heterocycles